Women in Turkey have an active participation in national politics, and the number of women in the Turkish parliament has been increasing steadily in recent elections.

Background

The Republic of Turkey was founded on the ashes of the Ottoman Empire on 29 October 1923. Although the political influence of some Valide Sultans (queen mothers) over the Ottoman Sultans was considerable, especially during the era known as the Sultanate of Women, women had no chance to serve in any official political post in the Ottoman era.

One notable female political activist in the first days of the Republican era was Nezihe Muhiddin, who founded  the first women's party in Turkey in June 1923; however, it was never legalized because the Republic was not officially declared yet. Mustafa Kemal Atatürk, the founder of the Republic initiated a series of reforms to modernize the country, including civil and political equality for women for the first time. On 17 February 1926, Turkey adopted a new civil code by which the rights of Turkish women and men were declared equal except in suffrage. Turkish women achieved voting rights in local elections by Act no. 1580 on 3 April 1930. Four years later, through legislation enacted on 5 December 1934, they gained full universal suffrage, earlier than many other countries.

President 

There have been no female president to date.

Speaker of Parliament 
Up to the present, there have been no female Speakers of Grand National Assembly in Turkey.

Vice president 
The post of vice President was established in 2018 and there have been no female Vice Presidents in Turkey.

Prime Minister (1920–2018) 

Tansu Çiller, a Turkish career professor of economics since 1983, entered politics in November 1990, joining the conservative True Path Party (DYP). On June 13, 1993, she was elected the party's leader, and on 25 June the same year, Çiller was appointed the Prime Minister of a coalition government, becoming Turkey's first and only female prime minister to date. She served at this post until 6 March 1996 in the 50th, 51st and the 52nd government of Turkey.

Prime Minister office was abolished in Turkey in 2018.

Government ministers

The first female Turkish government minister was Türkân Akyol, in 1971. She was the Minister of Health in Nihat Erim's technocratic government.(33rd government of Turkey)  In 1983, she was one of the founders of SODEP, short for Social Democracy Party, a new party which went on to become one of the major political parties of Turkey in 1980s.

Female government ministers up to the present are as follows:
{| class="sortable wikitable"
!Name
!Ministry
!Party
|-
|Türkân Akyol(1928–2017)||Minister of Health and Social Security (1971)Minister of State (Family) 1992–1993|| IndependentSHP
|-
|Nermin Neftçi(1924–2003)||Minister of Culture (1974–1975)||CGP
|-
|İmren Aykut(born 1940)||Minister of Labour and Social Security (1987–1991) Minister of State (1991 and 1996),Minister of Environment (1997–1999)||ANAP
|-
| Güler İleri(born 1948)|| Minister of State (1991–1993)||SHP
|-
| Aysel Baykal(1939–2003)|| Minister of State (1995–1995)||CHP
|-
| Önay Alpago(born 1947)|| Minister of State (1994–1995)||SHP
|-
| Işılay Saygın(1947-2019)|| Minister of State (1995–1996) Minister of Environment (1996), Minister of Tourism (1996)||DYP
|-
| Ayfer Yılmaz(born 1956)|| Minister of State (1996–1997)||DYP
|-
| Tansu Çiller(born 1946)||Minister of Foreign Affairs (1996–1997)||DYP
|-
| Meral Akşener(born 1956)||Minister of Interior (1996–1997)||DYP
|-
| Tayyibe Gülek(born 1968)|| Minister of State (1999–2002)||DSP
|-
| Melda Bayer(born 1950)|| Minister of State (1999–2002)||DSP
|-
| Aysel Çelikel(born 1933)||Minister of Justice (2002)||Independent
|-
|Güldal Akşit(born 1960)||Minister of Tourism (2002–2003) Minister of State (2003–2007)|| AKP
|-
| Nimet Baş(born 1965)|| Minister of State (2003–2007) Minister of National Education (2009–2011)|| AKP
|-
| Selma Aliye Kavaf(born 1962)|| Minister of State (Turkey) (2009–2011)|| AKP
|-
| Fatma Şahin(born 1966)||Minister of Family and Social Policies (2011–2013)|| AKP
|-
| Ayşenur İslam(born 1958)||Minister of Family and Social Policies (2013–2015) || AKP
|-
| Ayşen Gürcan(born 1963)||Minister of Family and Social Policies (2015) || Independent|-
| Beril Dedeoğlu(1961-2019)|| Minister of European Union (2015) || Independent|-
| Fatma Betül Sayan Kaya(born 1981) ||Minister of Family and Social Policy (2016–2018 ) || AKP
|-
| Jülide Sarıeroğlu(born 1979) ||Minister of Labour and Social Security (2017–2018) || AKP
|-
| Zehra Zümrüt Selçuk(born 1979) ||Minister of Family, Labour and Social Services (2018–2021) || AKP (non MP)|-
| Ruhsar Pekcan(born 1958) ||Minister of Trade (2018–2021) || AKP (non MP)|-
| Derya Yanık(born 1972) ||Minister of Family and Social Services (2021–present) || AKP (non MP)|}

 Deputy Speakers of the Parliament 

Although no woman council president has served in the Grand National Assembly of Turkey until today, several politicians have served as the Deputy Speaker of the Parliament at different times.  In 1972, the first female deputy president of the Republic of Turkey CGP parliamentary deputy has been Nermin Neftçi. Some of the other female deputy speakers were Meral Akşener (MHP), Güldal Mumcu (CHP) and finally Ayşe Nur Bahçekapılı (AK Party) for a long time.  

Party leaders

The first female Turkish party leader was Behice Boran (1910–1987). A member of the Workers Party of Turkey (TİP), she was elected as the chairman of the party in 1970 and continued in this post until all the political parties were closed following the September 11, 1980 military coup. Other female party leaders were:

 Mübeccel Göktuna  (1915–1999) National Women's Party of Turkey (TUKP) (1972–1981)
 Rahşan Ecevit (1923–2020), Democratic Left Party (DSP) (1985–1987), Democratic Left People's Party (DSHP) (2010)
 Tansu Çiller (born 1946) True Path Party (DYP) (1993–2002), (Prime Minister from 1993 to 1996)''
 Nesrin Nas (born 1958), Motherland Party (ANAP) (2003–2004)
 Filiz Koçali (born 1958), Socialist Democracy Party (2004–2009)
 Gültan Kışanak (born 1961), Peace and Democracy Party (BDP), (2011–2014)
 Sebahat Tuncel (born 1975) Peoples' Democratic Party (HDP) (2013–2014)
 Figen Yüksekdağ (born 1971), Peoples' Democratic Party (Turkey) (2014–2017) co-chair 
 Emine Ülker Tarhan (born 1963), Anatolia Party (2014–2015) As of 2014, she is the founder and leader of the party.
Fatma Benal Yazgan (born 1947), Women's Party (Turkey) (2014-present)
 Meral Akşener (born 1956), Good Party (2017–present) co-founder and leader
 Serpil Kemalbay, Peoples' Democratic Party (2017–2018) co-chair
 Pervin Buldan (born 1967), Peoples' Democratic Party (2018–present) co-chair

Women's parties 
Two parties were founded by women: National Women's Party of Turkey in 1972 (up to 1980)  and Women's Party (Turkey) in 2014

Parliamentary Group Vice Chairwoman 
According to the Turkish constitution, each party with over twenty seats forms a parliamentary group and each group is represented by 1–3 group vice chairpersons who are authorized to represent, in general terms, the relevant party in the parliament both in relation to the parliament administration and in relations with other party groups, as well as presiding the parliamentary group in the absence of the party president. The first female group vice chairperson in Turkish parliament was Oya Araslı of the Republican People's Party between 1996 and 1999. Later, there were two parliamentary group chairwomen in parliament: Emine Ülker Tarhan of the Republican People's Party and Pervin Buldan of the Peace and Democracy Party.

Members of Parliament 

The first female MPs of the Turkish Parliament, elected with the 8 February 1935 general elections.

1935–1999 elections
Following the promising 1935 start, however, the number of women in the parliament began to decrease. Especially in the 1950 and 1961 elections, only 3 women were able to enter the parliament, and since history has been given women the right to vote and be elected, it has been the least women entered into parliament.

2002–present elections
Since 1995, the number of women in the parliament has been continually on the rise. The 1935 percentage of women, the first year that women were able to be elected to parliament, was surpassed no earlier than in 1999. However, the female representation rate did not fall below 10 percent after the 2011 elections.

Members of the Senate (1961–1980) 
The Grand National Assembly of Turkey had a Senate (upper house) between 1961 and 1980. The following women were elected as the senators: 
 Mebrure Aksoley (1902–1984), Republican People's Party (CHP) (1964–1973)
 Fatma Hikmet İşmen, (1918–2006), Workers Party of Turkey (TİP) (1966–1975)
 Bahriye Üçok (1919–1990), State President's contingency (1971–1976). The only assassinated female politician.
Nermin Abadan Unat (born 1921), State President's contingency (1978–1980) 
 Aysel Baykal (1939–2003), Republican People's Party (CHP) (1979–1980)

Governor 

Turkey's first female governor was Lale Aytaman.  Aytaman, who served as the governor of Muğla between 1991-1995, was appointed to this position by President Turgut Özal.  Meanwhile, Turkey's first female district governor is Özlem Bozkurt Gevrek. She served in the Orta district of Çankırı in 1995. After these years, the number of female governors and district governors increased rapidly.

Local governments 
The first female muhtar (village head) in Turkey was Gülkız Ürbül, who became the muhtar of Demircidere village (now Karpuzlu) in the Çine district of Aydın Province in 1933. In the elections, she ran against seven male candidates. The first female city mayor was Müfide İlhan, who was elected as the mayor of Mersin in 1950.

See also
 Politics of Turkey
 Turkish order of precedence
 Women in Turkey
 Timeline of first women's suffrage in majority-Muslim countries

References

Turkish women in politics
Members of the Grand National Assembly of Turkey